Beaurains is a commune in the Pas-de-Calais department in the Hauts-de-France region in northern France.

Geography
A suburban town located 3 miles (5 km) south of Arras at the junction of the N17 with the D5 road.

History

The first church here was built in 674. In the 12th century, the parish council created an important leprosarium that treated Jean Bodel, a French poet. On 21 December 1922, a large treasure was discovered dating from the Roman era. Known as the Beaurains Treasure, much was squandered and the little that remains is now at Arras. However, a silver candelabra, gold coins and some jewellery from the treasure are also in the British Museum.
The commune was all but destroyed during the First World War.

Population

Sights
 The church of St. Martin, rebuilt after 1918, along with the rest of the village
 Vestiges of an old castle
 Two First World War cemeteries
 The Commonwealth War Graves Commission Visitor Center (CWGC Experience) inaugurated in June 2019.

Notable people
 The 19th-century French playwright and librettist Armand d'Artois was born in the village on 3 October 1788.

See also
Communes of the Pas-de-Calais department

References

External links

 Official website of Beaurains 
 The CWGC cemetery at Beaurains
 communal cemetery at Beaurains

Communes of Pas-de-Calais